Royal Air Force Berrow or more simply RAF Berrow is a former Royal Air Force Satellite Landing Ground located near Berrow, Worcestershire, England.

History
 No. 5 Maintenance Unit RAF. 
 No. 20 Maintenance Unit RAF.
 No. 38 Maintenance Unit RAF.

Current use
The site is currently used for farming.

See also
 List of Royal Air Force Satellite Landing Grounds

References

Royal Air Force stations in Worcestershire
Royal Air Force satellite landing grounds